Abdillahi Abokor Osman is a Somali politician, who is currently serving as the member of national contracting authority and deputy minister of the interior  Minister of Transportation and Roads Development of Somaliland.

See also

 Ministry of Transportation (Somaliland)
 Politics of Somaliland
 List of Somaliland politicians

References

People from Hargeisa
Peace, Unity, and Development Party politicians
Living people
Government ministers of Somaliland
Year of birth missing (living people)